Solitaneini is a tribe of geometer moths under subfamily Larentiinae.

Genera
 Baptria Hübner, 1825
 Povilasia Viidalepp, 1986
 Solitanea Djakonov, 1924

References

 
Larentiinae